Dwight School is an independent for-profit college preparatory school located on Manhattan's Upper West Side. Dwight offers the International Baccalaureate curriculum to students ages two through grade twelve.

History
Founded in 1872 by Julius Sachs as part of the Sachs Collegiate Institute, Dwight School was first known as "The Sachs School," then The Franklin School. Originally located on West 34th Street and Broadway, it relocated several times as it grew, ultimately moving to 18 West 89th Street in 1912. Sachs, a noted educator and author (and scion of the Goldman–Sachs family) headed the school until 1901 when he was appointed Professor of Education at Teachers College, Columbia University.

In 1880, the New York School of Languages was founded on 15 West 43rd Street as an academy of classical studies. Timothy Dwight, President of Yale University asked the school to pioneer a math and science program to replace traditional Greek and Latin as an entrance requirement.  The New York School of Languages was later renamed Timothy Dwight School in honor of that historic partnership.

In the late 1960s Moe C. Spahn and his wife bought the school for their son Stephen to run; after serving as assistant headmaster Stephen became headmaster on June 1, 1967.  Stephen's father Moe was the headmaster of the Franklin School which would later merge with Dwight. Owner Stephen Spahn's sister and her husband own New York City's York Preparatory School.

Dwight School merged with the Bentley School in 1977, in order to add elementary and middle school programs to its curriculum.

In 1993, Dwight School merged with the Franklin School (which had adopted the International Baccalaureate (IB) Program in 1980) and moved from 402 East 67th Street to its present location at 291 Central Park West. In 1996, Dwight School became the first school in North America to offer the full International Baccalaureate (IB) program from preschool through grade 12.

Today, one-third of Dwight's students come from overseas.

Institution

Chancellor
Stephen H. Spahn has been the school's owner, chancellor, and headmaster since 1967. Spahn serves on the Boards of the International Baccalaureate Fund and the Rubin Museum of Art.  He was also a founding member of the Guild of International Baccalaureate Schools. In 2011, Spahn was awarded the Lewis Hine Distinguished Service Award from the National Child Labor Committee.

Divisions and houses

There are four co-educational divisions at Dwight School: The Riverside campus (preschool-kindergarten) occupies three buildings on Riverside Boulevard between 66th and 68th Streets. The Lower School (grades 1–5) is located on the main campus and occupies a brownstone at 17 West 88th Street. The middle school (grades 6–8) and the upper school (grades 9–12) are also located on the main campus but primarily use the buildings at 18 West 89th Street and 291 Central Park West. In 2012, the school added additional classrooms and athletics space by expanding into the adjoining brownstone located at 22 West 89th Street.

Within divisions, the grades are further separated into houses: Timothy House (grades 1–5), Bentley House (grades 6–8), Franklin House (grades 9–10), and Anglo House (grades 11–12). A dean oversees each house. An executive team consisting of the Head of School and the heads of the upper, middle, and lower schools manage the academic and pastoral areas of the school. The Head of School works closely with the school's chancellor and vice-chancellor, who also oversee admissions and the business office.

Admissions

Admission to Dwight School is selective. Kindergarten, sixth grade, and ninth grade are Dwight's largest entry points, with forty students entering kindergarten, fifteen entering sixth grade and twenty-five entering ninth grade.  Each year, a smaller number of students are accepted in other grades. Dwight offers rolling admissions for international families due to the wide range of academic calendars around the world.

The admissions process at Dwight School is based on school reports, teacher recommendations, ERB/ISEE test results, and student/parent interviews. In the 1980s and 1990s, however, Dwight was often a last resort for students who had been kicked out of independent private schools in the city for various reasons—usually academic performance—but not for behavior problems.

Dwight Schools Global Network
The Dwight Schools are an international network of campuses and programs, which include Dwight School in New York, Dwight Global Online School, Dwight School London in England, the Shanghai Qibao Dwight High School, in Shanghai, China, Dwight School Seoul, and Dwight School Dubai in the United Arab Emirates, which held its grand opening in September 2018.

Dwight School's association with Dwight School London goes back over 40 years when Stephen Spahn, Chancellor of Dwight School New York opened the school.  In 2008, what was known as Woodside Park International School was renamed as The North London International School (NLIS) and later renamed Dwight School London in 2012.  In 2010, Dwight London opened a partner school in London called The Holmewood School (THSL) which aims to provide special education for children of high cognitive ability with difficulties associated with autism.  In 2009, Dwight entered into the first joint diploma program in China with the Capital Normal High School, attached to Capital Normal University, in Beijing.  Through this program, each student receives a joint Capital Normal/Dwight School diploma with strong emphasis on English as a Second Language.

In 2010, Dwight was chosen from 180 foreign schools by the government of Seoul, Korea, to open Dwight School Seoul as a model IB School for five hundred forty students in grades K-12. Opened in fall 2012, the school is housed within a new multimillion-dollar media and culture complex, Seoul's Digital Media City.

Academics – International Baccalaureate Program 
In 1996, Dwight became the second school in North America to offer all three International Baccalaureate (IB) Programs: the IB Primary Years Program, for students grades 3 to 12; the IB Middle Years Program, for students in grades 6–10; and the IB Diploma Program, for students in grades 11–12. A Certificate Program is available to students who do not wish to pursue the full IB Diploma Program and instead take some elective courses. Approximately half the graduating seniors receive the full IB diploma.

Athletics 
Dwight has fielded athletic teams since the founding of the school. It is a member of the ISAL and the ACIS athletic leagues as well as the New York State Association of Independent Schools (NYSAIS). Dwight participates in the following sports:

 Basketball
 Track and Field
 Indoor Track
 Cross-Country
 Fencing
 Baseball
 Softball
 Volleyball
 Soccer
 Swimming
 Golf
 Rugby
 Tennis

Demographics
The demographic breakdown of the 574 students enrolled for the 2013–2014 school year is as follows.

Asian – 5.1%
Black – 3.8%
Hispanic – 3.1%
White – 59.2%
Multiracial – 28.8%

Notable alumni
 Dana Barron, actress
Richard K. Bernstein, physician and an advocate for a low-carbohydrate diabetes diet
Antonio Campos, film director, screenwriter and film producer
 Truman Capote, author
 Julian Casablancas, musician, The Strokes
Addison O'Dea, documentary filmmaker
 Joseph Cullman, tobacco magnate
 Damon Dash, entrepreneur, music producer and actor
 Doug Davis, businessman and entertainment lawyer
 Harry L. Fisher, noted chemist
 Julius J. Gans, lawyer, politician, and judge
Jonah Goldberg, syndicated columnist, Los Angeles Times
 Lizzie Grubman, publicist, manager and socialite
 Paris Hilton, socialite, heiress, entrepreneur
 Race Imboden, Olympic fencer
 Kamara James, Olympic fencer
 Casey Johnson, socialite
 Robert Kalloch, Hollywood costume designer
 Fiorello H. La Guardia, Mayor of New York
 Serge Kovaleski, Pulitzer Prize-winning reporter, The New York Times
 Sam Lansky, journalist for Time and other publications
 Herbert Henry Lehman, governor of New York state
 Roy Lichtenstein, artist
 Walter Lippmann, author
 Fabrizio Moretti, musician, The Strokes
 Henry Morgenthau, Jr., politician
 Robert Moses, noted city planner
 Josh Ostrovsky, "The Fat Jewish", entrepreneur, social media personality
 Harold Prince, producer
 Keith Raywood, designer
 Paul J. Sachs, businessman and museum director
 Alix Smith, photographer
 Paul Strauss, US Senator
 Scott A. Travers, author and numismatist
 Vanessa Trump, actress, ex-wife of Donald Trump Jr.
 Nick Valensi, musician, The Strokes
 Hans Zinsser, immunologist

Notes

External links
 

Educational institutions established in 1880
Private elementary schools in Manhattan
Private middle schools in Manhattan
Private high schools in Manhattan
International Baccalaureate schools in New York (state)
Preparatory schools in New York City
Upper West Side
1880 establishments in New York (state)
For profit schools in Manhattan